Drosera ramellosa, sometimes referred to as the branched sundew, is a tuberous perennial species in the genus Drosera that is endemic to Western Australia. It was first formally described by Johann Georg Christian Lehmann in 1844. It was again described by Jules Émile Planchon as Drosera penduliflora in 1848, which was reduced to synonymy under D. ramellosa in 1864 by George Bentham.

Overview
It produces 1 to 3 erect stems that grow to 4 to 12 cm tall. The erect major stems that possess only alternate leaves with inflorescences emerging from the basal rosette distinguish it from all other members of the section Stolonifera. It is native to large region from Kalbarri south to Cranbrook and east to Mount Ragged. It grows in winter-wet sandy or sand-clay soils and flowers from July to September.

See also 
List of Drosera species

References

External links

Carnivorous plants of Australia
Caryophyllales of Australia
Eudicots of Western Australia
Plants described in 1844
ramellosa